Batomys uragon (proposed common name Mount Isarog hairy-tailed rat) is a species of cloud rat endemic to the Philippines. It was first discovered in 1988, and the full description was published in 2015, in the Proceedings of the Biological Society of Washington. It is so far found only on Luzon, the largest island in the Philippines. The first specimen was collected from Mount Isarog at the southern side of the island. Other 14 specimens were later collected. It is the fourth species of mammal (so far known) living only on that mountain. The new species was described by Danilo S. Balete, Eric A. Rickart, Lawrence R. Heaney, and Sharon A. Jansa. It was classified as new species based on DNA analyses and structural descriptions (morphometric analyses). It is different from its closest relative, the Luzon hairy-tailed rat (Batomys granti), in its cytochrome b sequence, moderate body size, colour patterns, and skull structure.

Etymology

The specific name uragon is a Bicol word, the language of the local people, the Bicolanos in Luzon. Having no direct English rendering, the word is loosely translated as "possessing great ability, vitality, or power". This is to attribute the species for its dispersal ability, persistence, and uniqueness to the Bicol Peninsula.

Discovery

The first specimen (now the holotype) of B. uragon was collected by Eric A. Rickart, Curator of Vertebrates at the Natural History Museum of Utah, on 25 April 1988. It is an old adult male. The expedition was funded by U.S. National Science Foundation and the Smithsonian Institution. Later, 14 specimens were collected from around the same region. The specimens are deposited at the National Museum of Natural History, Smithsonian Institution. DNA studies were performed by Sharon A. Jansa.

Description

Of the species of Batomys known to live on Mount Isarog, the large-toothed hairy-tailed rat (B. dentatus) is distinct. But B. granti is basically similar to B. uragon. B. uragon differs from B. granti in slightly larger body, longer legs, but shorter tail, and larger skull. Males are larger than females. Karyotype shows that it has 52 chromosomes (haploid, n=26). The colour of the fur is pale golden-brown. There are colour variations in individuals. One male specimen has a small pale brown patch of fur on the left side of the lower abdomen. The holotype has a pale golden fur, paler than other specimens.

Biology

They live in old-growth montane and mossy forest, where there are thick leaf litters and humus layers. They eat nuts and seeds, hence, they have granivorous-frugivorous diet. They are nocturnal and good climbers.

References

External links
Profile at Mammal's Planet
Taxon profile at BioLib

Mammals described in 2015
Fauna of Luzon
Rodents of the Philippines
Endemic fauna of the Philippines
Batomys